Alatini is both a surname and a given name. Notable people with the name include:

Surname:
Megan Alatini (born 1976), South African-born New Zealand singer, actress and television personality
Pita Alatini (born 1976), Tongan-born New Zealand rugby union player

Given name:
Alatini Saulala (born 1967), Tongan rugby union player and coach

Tongan-language surnames